Stergos Marinos (born 17 September 1987) is a Greek former professional footballer who played as a right-back.

Club career

Youth career & Atromitos
He was born on the Greek island of Kos and started his career in 2001 at local team Asklipios Ko. In 2004, he moved to Nikea-based club Chalkidona and when Chalkidona merged with Atromitos, he was transferred to the latter.

Marinos won the 2008–09 Beta Ethniki championship with Atromitos.

Panathinaikos
On 24 August 2009, Marinos signed a contract with Panathinaikos as a replacement for Bryce Moon, who was sent away on loan to PAOK the same year. He joined Panathinaikos a week later, on 31 August, and made his league debut on 13 September 2009 in an away game against Panthrakikos, playing a full 90 minutes.

He was a member of the Panathinaikos team that won the double in 2010.

Charleroi
On 14 July 2013 Marinos signed a two year contract for an undisclosed fee with the Belgian club Charleroi. He made his debut with the club on 17 August 2013 in a 1–2 home loss against Kortrijk and scored his first goal on 29 November 2014 in a 2–3 away win against Westerlo. On 12 August 2015, after a remarkable year with the club, Marinos extended his contract till the summer 2018. He returned to the squad after three months playing as a starter in a 3–2 home loss against Waasland-Beveren.
On 21 April 2016, almost at the end of the 2015–16 season, Frédéric Borlée, doctor of the club, summarises the doctoral report:" He suffers from the disease of Haglund . Basically, it has a bony outgrowth at the back of the calcaneus (heel) which caused partial rupture of the Achilles tendon. The operation is necessary." Furthermore, "...the Greek midfielder had several injuries in the last few months and his return to the squad should not occur before 4–5 months", the doctor concluded. Marinos will therefore miss the summer preparation as well as the beginning of 2016–17 season. After a very difficult period for the defender marred by injury (252 days to be exact), on 17 December 2016, he returned to the squad as a starter in a 2–0 home win against Royal Excel Mouscron.
On 19 February 2017, in a 1–1 away draw against rivals K.R.C. Genk, he scored his first goal in the season as a substitute, helping his club to climb in the 5th position of the League. He started the 2017–18 season as a starter. On 1 December 2017, in a home game draw against rivals K.V. Oostende reached 100 League appearances with the club's jersey.
On 28 March 2018, during an impressive season, Marinos renew his contract with Charleroi for three years (plus an optional year) for an undisclosed fee.

International career
Marinos was a Greece U19 international. In 2010, he was called up to the Greece national team by Otto Rehhagel however did not make an appearance. He was called again by Fernando Santos and he made his debut for Greece on 11 August 2010 during a friendly match against Serbia, coming as a late substitute.

Club statistics

Honours

Atromitos
Beta Ethniki: 2008–09

Panathinaikos
Superleague Greece: 2009–10
Greek Cup: 2010

References

External links
Official website

1987 births
Living people
People from Kos
Greek footballers
Greece international footballers
Greece youth international footballers
Panathinaikos F.C. players
Atromitos F.C. players
R. Charleroi S.C. players
Super League Greece players
Football League (Greece) players
Belgian Pro League players
Expatriate footballers in Belgium
Greek expatriate footballers
Greek expatriate sportspeople in Belgium
Association football fullbacks
Association football midfielders
Sportspeople from the South Aegean